Karakoumi is a village in Cyprus, located about 2 kilometers from Kyrenia. De facto, it is under the control of Northern Cyprus.

References 

Communities in Kyrenia District
Populated places in Girne District